The Sea Beast is a 2022 computer-animated adventure film directed by Chris Williams, who co-wrote the screenplay with Nell Benjamin and produced with Jed Schlanger. The film stars the voices of Karl Urban, Zaris-Angel Hator, Jared Harris, and Marianne Jean-Baptiste. It tells the story of a sea monster hunter and a young orphan girl who joins his group of sea monster hunters on their search for the elusive Red Bluster in the 17th century.

The film began a limited theatrical release on June 24, 2022, before debuting on Netflix on July 8. It received positive reviews from critics and became the most-successful Netflix original animated film, with 165 million hours viewed over its first five months of release. The film earned several nominations, including Best Animated Feature at the 95th Academy Awards, only to lose to another Netflix original animated film Guillermo del Toro's Pinocchio. A sequel is in development.

Plot

For hundreds of years, sea beasts have surfaced to wreak havoc against humankind. In response, sailors known as 'hunters' venture outward on their ships to hunt the beasts across the ocean, the most famous and successful of these being the crew of the Inevitable; led by the legendary Captain Crow, his first mate Sarah Sharpe, and his adopted son Jacob Holland. The hunters are financially backed by the King and Queen of The Crown, who have established a distinguished society dubbed Three Bridges as a result of the hunters' success over the centuries. After being nearly killed during a hunt, Crow tells Jacob that he will make him captain once they kill a female sea beast known as the Red Bluster that took his eye decades earlier.

The crew returns to Three Bridges to collect payment for their latest catch, but are told by the King and Queen that they will soon be replaced by a naval vessel named Imperator, headed by Admiral Hornagold, the latter of whom feels the hunters are outdated and will carry on the hunting of sea beasts in their place. This angers Crow and Sarah and nearly results in their arrest before Jacob proposes that his crew be given one more chance to kill the Red Bluster to prove their worth. The King, Queen, and Hornagold accept, with the Crown declaring a contest between the crews of the Imperator and Inevitable and the winner being allowed to hunt the sea beasts in their name.

After they depart, the crew discovers that an orphan girl named Maisie Brumble has stowed away on the ship to join them, having been inspired to do so by her late parents. The Inevitable finds and attacks the Red Bluster. Against Crow's orders, Jacob hesitantly allows Maisie to cut a rope connecting the ship to the Bluster, which saves the crew, but lets the Bluster escape and throws Jacob and Maisie into the sea. Angered, Crow holds both of them at gunpoint and demands Jacob bring Maisie to him before the Bluster emerges from the depths and swallows Maisie and Jacob whole.

The Bluster takes Jacob and Maisie to an isolated island populated by several other beasts. Maisie discovers that the Bluster is not malicious and befriends the beast, naming her Red, while also befriending a smaller beast named Blue. Maisie begins to believe that the monsters are really just misunderstood creatures, which Jacob initially denies. Jacob and Maisie convince Red to take them to Rum Pepper island, so they can secure a ship to return to Three Bridges.

Believing Jacob to be dead, Crow seeks out an elderly merchant named Gwen Batterbie, who gives Crow a poison-tipped harpoon powerful enough to kill Red. While on Red's back, Jacob and Maisie bond with the creature and each other, with Jacob growing to support Maisie's belief of the beasts being innocent. They reach Rum Pepper Island but discover that the Imperator and Hornagold are stationed there. Red attacks the vessel after being shot at by a crewmember, and inadvertently wounds Maisie in the scuffle. After destroying the Imperator, Jacob momentarily stops Red from killing Hornagold.

Red spots the Inevitable and attacks, but is shot with the poison-tipped harpoon and nearly dies, with Crow keeping her alive long enough to bring her to The Crown as a trophy. Maisie is nursed back to health but then imprisoned aboard the Inevitable as it arrives at Three Bridges with Red in tow. After Blue frees Maisie, she realizes the hatred of sea beasts is all propaganda created by the Crown to extend their rule.

Crow prepares to publicly execute Red before being stopped by Jacob. Crow and Jacob fight, while Maisie and Sarah, who begins to believe Maisie's worldview of the beasts, free Red from her binds. Maisie and Jacob convince Red to spare Crow, subsequently exposing The Crown for their deceptions. After witnessing the passive nature of the beasts, Crow and the rest of the kingdom renounce their beliefs. With Red and the other sea beasts left alone, Maisie, Blue, and Jacob begin their new lives together as a family.

Voice cast

Production
On November 5, 2018, Netflix announced that Chris Williams would write and direct a brand new animated film Jacob and the Sea Beast, based on his own original story. On November 7, 2020, the film was retitled to The Sea Beast.

Animation services were provided by Sony Pictures Imageworks in Vancouver.

Mark Mancina composed the film's score. Mancina also produced an original song called "Captain Crow" a sea shanty depicting the character written by Nell Benjamin and Laurence O'Keefe.

Release
In March 2022, Netflix announced its premiere date for July 8, 2022. The film was released in select theaters on June 24, 2022, before its Netflix debut.

Reception

Accolades

Sequel
In January 2023, Williams announced in an interview with The Hollywood Reporter that he had signed a deal with Netflix and would be working on a sequel to The Sea Beast following the film's massive success.

References

External links 
 
 

2022 adventure films
2020s American animated films
2022 fantasy films
2020s children's animated films
2020s monster movies
2022 computer-animated films
2022 films
American fantasy adventure films
American animated fantasy films
American monster movies
Canadian fantasy adventure films
Canadian animated fantasy films
English-language Netflix original films
Films directed by Chris Williams
Films scored by Mark Mancina
Films with screenplays by Chris Williams
Giant monster films
Kaiju films
Netflix Animation films
Seafaring films
2020s English-language films
Pirate films
2020s Canadian films